The Hurling Team of the Century was chosen as part of the Gaelic Athletic Association's centenary year celebrations in 1984 to comprise, as a fifteen-member side divided as one goalkeeper, three half-backs, two midfielders, three half-forwardss and three full-forwards, the best hurling players of the first one hundred years of the Gaelic Athletic Association.  The players on the team were nominated by Sunday Independent readers and were selected by a panel of experts and former players.

A team was also selected of players who had never won an All Ireland.



References

Hurling awards
Team